My Coolest Years is a television program that aired on VH1 in which actors, musicians, and other celebrities reminisce about their high school years.

Overview
Past programs have centered on The Geeks, B-Boys and B-Girls, My Summer Vacation, In the Closet, Dirty Hippies, My First Time (sexual experience), Bad Girls, Jocks and Cheerleaders, Rich Kids, The Metalheads. Brian Kirk made his first TV appearance on this show.

Celebrities interviewed include:

 Stephen Baldwin
 Tyson Beckford
 Nuno Bettencourt
 Jim Breuer
 Da Brat
 Nate Dogg
 Jermaine Dupri
 Fat Joe
 Christian Finnegan
 Andrew Firestone 
 Warren G
 Vincent Gallo
 Kadeem Hardison
 Julio Iglesias Jr.
 Jordan Knight
 Juliette Lewis

 Angie Martinez
 Finesse Mitchell
 Kel Mitchell
 Steve-O
 O.A.R
 Catherine Oxenberg
 Paula Jai Parker
 Penn & Teller
 John Popper
 Rah Digga
 Sherri Shepherd
 Morgan Spurlock
 Sheryl Swoopes
 Ben Stein
 Joe Torry
 Rachel True
 Paul Tyma
 Wil Wheaton
 Andrew W.K.

External links
 

VH1 original programming
2004 American television series debuts
2005 American television series endings